McKitrick is a surname. Notable people with the surname include:

Annie McKitrick (born 1952), Canadian politician
Eric McKitrick, American historian
Jenifer McKitrick (born 1976), songwriter, screenwriter, musician
Ross McKitrick (born 1965), Canadian economist

See also
McKittrick